Leslie Cornelius Arends (September 27, 1895July 17, 1985) was a Republican politician from Illinois who served in the United States House of Representatives from 1935 until 1974.

A native and lifelong resident of Melvin, Illinois, Arends attended Oberlin College and served in the United States Navy during World WarI. He was involved in farming and banking; in addition to renting out several farms he owned, he eventually became president of the local bank his father had started.

Arends was elected to the U.S. House in 1934. He served from 1935 until resigning on December 31, 1974. From 1943 until his retirement, Arends served as the Republican Whip, holding the post during periods of Republican majority (1947-1949, 1953–1955) and minority (1943-1947, 1949–1953, 1955–1974). In addition, Arends rose by seniority to become the ranking minority member of the House Armed Services Committee.

A party loyalist, Arends opposed much government spending, and provided strong support to the party's presidential candidates. He remained loyal to Richard M. Nixon during the Watergate scandal, and indicated that he would not vote to impeach Nixon.

After resigning from the House, Arends served on the President's Intelligence Advisory Board, and lived in retirement in Melvin, Washington, DC, and Naples, Florida. He died in Naples, and was buried in Melvin.

Early life
Born in Melvin, Illinois, on September 27, 1895, Arends was the youngest of ten children (only seven lived to adulthood) born to George Teis Arends and Talea (née Weiss) Arends. His father was born in Peoria to parents who were both natives of Germany; his mother was born in Hanover, Germany.

Arends attended the local schools and from 1912 to 1913 was a student at Oberlin College in Ohio. He enlisted  in the United States Navy during World WarI, where he played in the Navy band at numerous war bond rallies. After his discharge he acquired and rented out several farms, and became active in banking. He eventually became president of the Commercial State Bank in Melvin, which had been founded by his father. He was a member of the Ford County Farm Bureau, and a member of the board of trustees of Illinois Wesleyan University, which awarded him the honorary degree of LL.D. in 1962.

Congressional career

In 1934, Arends was elected to the 74th Congress. He was reelected nineteen times, and served from January 3, 1935, until resigning on December 31, 1974, a few days before the end of his final term. He alternately served as majority whip and minority whip for House Republicans from 1943 to 1974, and was the longest-serving whip in U.S. House of Representatives history. He rose through seniority to become the ranking Republican on the House Armed Services Committee, where one of his pet projects was preventing the closure of Chanute Air Force Base in Illinois; it remained open until 1993.

Arends represented a heavily Republican, largely rural downstate Illinois district. Conservative but pragmatic, he opposed much of the New Deal and remained a staunch isolationist until America entered World WarII. After becoming minority whip in 1943, Arends helped create the powerful Conservative Coalition of Republicans and Southern Democrats who controlled the domestic agenda from 1937 to 1964. He was reelected as whip amid Republican in-fighting following their large Congressional losses in the 1964 elections; after their setback, House Republicans replaced leader Charles Halleck with Gerald Ford. Ford backed Peter Frelinghuysen Jr. for Whip. Arends had usually been reelected Whip without opposition, and despite a strong challenge from Frelinghuysen relied on personal relationships forged over thirty years to provide the votes that enabled him to retain the post.

He supported Robert A. Taft over Dwight D. Eisenhower for the 1952 Republican presidential nomination, and was an early supporter of the party's nominees Richard M. Nixon and Barry Goldwater in the campaigns of the 1960s. He organized the GOP opposition to Lyndon B. Johnson's Great Society. Arends voted in favor of the Civil Rights Acts of 1957, 1964, and 1968, and the Voting Rights Act of 1965, while Arends did not vote on the Civil Rights Act of 1960 and voted present on the 24th Amendment to the U.S. Constitution. During the Watergate scandal, Arends provided unwavering loyalty to President Richard M. Nixon, and said he would not vote for impeachment, citing his strong personal friendship with Nixon and belief that Nixon had performed capably as president. Despite the Whip challenge following the 1966 elections, Nixon's successor Gerald Ford and Arends maintained a close personal friendship, ensuring Arends a good relationship with the White House after Nixon's resignation.

Post-Congressional career

After leaving Congress, Arends served on the President's Intelligence Advisory Board, and spent time at homes in Melvin, Naples, Florida, and Washington, DC.

Legacy

Arends's papers are part of the collections of Illinois Wesleyan University, and the university library's special collections room was named for him.

Death and burial

Arends died in Naples on July 17, 1985, and was buried at Melvin Cemetery in Melvin. He was survived by his wife Betty (Tychon) and daughter Leslie ("Letty").

Notes and References

Sources

Newspapers

Books

Internet

Further reading

Lichtenstein, Nelson et al. Political Profiles. Volume 3, "The Kennedy Years". pg 14. New York: Facts On File, Inc, 1976.
Schapsmeier, Edward L. and Frederick H. Schapsmeier, "Serving under Seven Presidents: Les Arends and His Forty Years in Congress". Illinois Historical Journal 1992 85(2): 105–118.

External links

1895 births
1985 deaths
United States Navy personnel of World War I
American people of German descent
Businesspeople from Illinois
Military personnel from Illinois
Oberlin College alumni
People from Ford County, Illinois
United States Navy sailors
Republican Party members of the United States House of Representatives from Illinois
20th-century American politicians
Old Right (United States)
20th-century American businesspeople